Amos Adekunle Ojo (born 20 July 1962) is a Nigerian wrestler. He competed in the 1988 and 1992 Summer Olympics.

References

1962 births
Living people
Wrestlers at the 1988 Summer Olympics
Wrestlers at the 1992 Summer Olympics
Nigerian male sport wrestlers
Olympic wrestlers of Nigeria
20th-century Nigerian people